The 1941 Washington and Lee Generals football team was an American football team that represented Washington and Lee University as a member of the Southern Conference during the 1941 college football season. In its first and only season under head coach Riley Smith, the team compiled a 1–6–2 record (1–2–2 against conference opponents), finished in fifth place in the conference, and was outscored by a total of 93 to 69.

Schedule

References

Washington and Lee
Washington and Lee Generals football seasons
Washington and Lee Generals football